William Howard, 4th Earl of Wicklow KP (13 February 1788 – 22 March 1869) was an Anglo-Irish peer, styled Lord Clonmore from 1815 to 1818. 

He was the eldest son of William Howard, 3rd Earl of Wicklow and Eleanor Caulfeild. He became Earl of Wicklow in 1818 on the death of his father, and on 10 November 1821 he was elected as an Irish representative peer, thus enabling him to sit in the House of Lords as a Tory. Between 1831 and his death he served as the first Lord Lieutenant of Wicklow, and he was appointed a Knight of the Order of St Patrick on 9 October 1846.

On 16 February 1816, he married Lady Cecil Frances Hamilton, the only child of John Hamilton, 1st Marquess of Abercorn by his second wife, Cecil Hamilton. He had no male issue, and was succeeded in his title by his nephew, Charles Howard.

References

1788 births
1869 deaths
19th-century Anglo-Irish people
William
Irish representative peers
Knights of St Patrick
Lord-Lieutenants of Wicklow
4